The 2014 Pittsburgh Steelers season was the franchise's 82nd season as a professional sports franchise and as a member of the National Football League. It also marked the 15th season under leadership of general manager Kevin Colbert and the eighth under head coach Mike Tomlin.

The Steelers honored the 40th anniversary of their first Super Bowl winning team, Super Bowl IX, during their Week 13 game against the New Orleans Saints at Heinz Field on November 30. (The Steelers played the Super Bowl at Tulane Stadium that year.) The team wore a special patch and honored the players at halftime. Though it also serves as the team's annual alumni weekend, the team did not wear their alternate 1934 "Bumblebee" throwbacks for this game. Instead, the Steelers wore the "Bumblebee" jerseys vs. the Indianapolis Colts on October 26.

They managed to improve from their 8–8 record from each of their previous two seasons with their week 15 victory against the Atlanta Falcons, and ensured their first winning season since 2011. They also clinched a playoff berth for the first time since that same year with their week 16 victory over the Kansas City Chiefs. The Steelers won the AFC North division title, but lost to the Baltimore Ravens in the Wild Card round of the playoffs by a score of 30–17. The Steelers became the first team in NFL history to have a 4,500-yard passer, 1,500-yard receiver and 1,300-yard rusher in the same season. This season holds the record for the most points the Steelers have ever scored with 436, which was possible in part by goring the Colts 51-34, and goring the Ravens 43-23 in back-to-back weeks. There were ten instances of the Steelers scoring 27 points or more. The Steelers went 9-1 in those games, with their only loss being by a field goal.

2014 draft class

(+) Compensatory Selection

Draft trades
 The Steelers traded their original third-round selection (No. 83 overall) to the Cleveland Browns in exchange for the Browns' 2013 fourth-round selection.

Staff

Final roster

Schedule

Preseason

Regular season

Note: Intra-division opponents are in bold text.

Postseason

Game summaries

Regular season

Week 1: vs. Cleveland Browns

The Steelers started their 2014 season at home against the Browns.  In the first quarter, the Steelers would score first when Shaun Suisham kicked a 36-yard field goal for a 3–0 lead.  However, the Browns were able to tie it up when Billy Cundiff kicked a 39-yard field goal for a 3–3 game.  The Steelers would score 24 unanswered points to end the first half with LaGarrette Blount running for a 7-yard TD to retake the lead 10–3.  In the 2nd quarter, the Steelers continued their domination when Ben Roethlisberger found Antonio Brown on a 35-yard TD for a 17–3 lead followed by Le'Veon Bell running in for a TD from 38 yards out to increase their lead to 24–3 followed by Suisham nailing yet another field goal from 34 yards out as they led 27–3 at halftime.  After the break, in the 3rd quarter, the Browns went to work as Isisah Crowell ran for 2 touchdowns:  from 3 and 15 yards out for a 27–10 and 27–17 game.  In the 4th quarter, the Browns managed to come within a TD as Cundiff nailed a 25-yard field goal for a 27–20 game.  Later on, Brian Hoyer hooked up with Travis Benjamein on a 9-yard TD pass to tie the game up 27–27.  Regardless, Roethlisberger was able to move his team down the field and eventually, Suisham kicked the game-winning 41-yard field goal to win it 30–27 for the Steelers' only 3 points of the 2nd half.

With the win, the Steelers started their season 1–0 for the first time since 2010 and in turn handed the Browns their 10th straight regular season opening loss.

Week 2: at Baltimore Ravens

After a close home win over the Browns, the Steelers traveled to Baltimore to take on the Ravens on Thursday Night Football.  The Ravens scored first in the first quarter when Joe Flacco found Owen Daniels on a 2-yard TD pass for a 7–0 lead.  They increased their lead in the 2nd quarter as Justin Tucker nailed a 30-yard field goal for a 10–0 lead.  The Steelers finally got on the board when Shaun Suisham kicked a 25-yard field goal for a 10–3 game at halftime.  Returning after the break, the Steelers went back to work and were able to move down the field for Suisham to kick another field goal from 43 yards out to come within 4 with for a 10–6 game.  However, the Ravens started to take control later on when Flacco found Daniels again on a 1-yard TD pass making the score 17–6.  In the 4th quarter, the Ravens sealed the game with 3 field goals kicked by Tucker from 23, 22, and 20 yards out for a 20–6, 23–6, and 26–6 final score.

The Steelers were held without a touchdown in a game for the first time since their 20-3 loss to the 49ers in 2011.  The team dropped to 1–1.

Week 3: at Carolina Panthers

After a rough loss to the Ravens, the Steelers traveled down south to take on the Panthers.  In the first quarter, the Panthers scored first when Graham Gano kicked a 40-yard field goal for a 3–0 lead.  However, the Steelers were able to tie it up when Shaun Suisham kicked a 42-yard field goal for a 3–3 game.  In the 2nd quarter, the Steelers increased their lead with 2 more field goals from 24 and 45 yards out for leads of 6–3 and then 9–3 at halftime.  In the 3rd quarter, the Steelers got back to work as Ben Roethlisberger hooked up with Antonio Brown on a 7-yard TD pass for a 16–3 lead.  Gano got the Panthers within 10 with another field goal from 40 yards out for a 16–6 game.  However, the Steelers pulled away as Roethlisberger found Brown again on a 7-yard TD pass for a 23–6 lead.  In the 4th quarter, Cam Newton found Greg Olson on a 37-yard TD Pass coming within 10 23–13.  However, the Steelers pulled away as Robert Golden recovered a fumble in the end zone for a 30–13 game.  Later on, LaGarrette Blount ran for a 7-yard TD increasing their lead to 37–13.  The Panthers tried their hand at coming back but could only come away with 6 points as 2nd-string QB Derek Anderson found Kelvin Benjamin on a 35-yard TD pass (with a failed 2-point conversion) for an eventual final score of 37–19.

With the win, the Steelers improved to 2–1.

Week 4: vs. Tampa Bay Buccaneers

After a huge win on the road, the Steelers returned home for a game against the Buccaneers.  The Bucs scored first when Mike Glennon found Mike Evans on a 7-yard TD pass for a 7–0 lead.  They increased their lead when Patrick Murray kicked a 50-yard field goal for a 10-lead.  The Steelers finally got on the board when Shaun Suisham nailed a 25-yard field goal to come within a TD, 10–3 followed by Ben Roethlisberger hooking up with Antonio Brown on an 11-yard TD pass to tie the game up at 10–10.  In the 2nd quarter, Roethlisberger found Brown again this time on a 27-yard TD pass to take the lead 17–10 at halftime.  After the break, Doug Martin ran for a TD from 3 yards out to tie the game back up, 17–17.  The Steelers pulled away as Roethlisberger found Heath Miller on a 5-yard TD pass for a 24–17 lead.  In the 4th quarter, the Bucs pulled within 4 when Murray kicked a 27-yard field goal for a 24–20 game.  Driving down the field, the Bucs were able to complete the comeback attempt as Glennon found Vincent Jackson on a 5-yard TD pass for a final score of 27–24.

The loss dropped the Steelers to 2–2.

Week 5: at Jacksonville Jaguars

After a tough home loss, the Steelers traveled down south again to take on the Jaguars.  The Jags scored first as Josh Scobee kicked a 43-yard field goal for a 3–0 lead for the only score of the first quarter.  The Steelers answered to tie the game when Shaun Suisham kicked a 24-yard field goal for a 3–3 game.  They eventually took the lead when Ben Roetlisberger found Michael Palmer on a 1-yard TD pass to take a 10–3 lead.  The Jags pulled within 4 before halftime when Scobee nailed a 35-yard field goal to make it a 10–6 game.  In the 3rd quarter, the Jags came within a point as Scobee kicked a 36-yard field goal to make it a 10–9 game for the only score of the quarter.  In the 4th quarter however, Brice McCain picked off Jags QB Blake Bortles and returned the interception for a 22-yard TD increasing their lead to the eventual final score of 17–9.

With the win, the Steelers improved to 3–2.

Week 6: at Cleveland Browns

The Steelers traveled back up north to Cleveland to take on the Browns.  In the first quarter, the Steelers score the only 3 points as Shaun Suisham nailed a 20-yard field goal to take a 3–0 lead.  The Browns however scored 21 unanswered points in the 2nd quarter when Isaiah Crowell ran for a 5-yard TD to take a 7–3 lead followed by Brian Hoyer hooking up with Jordan Cameron on a 51-yard TD pass for a 14–3 lead before finally Ben Tate ran for an 8-yard TD and took a 21–3 lead at halftime.  The Browns continued their domination day in the 3rd quarter when Billy Cundiff kicked a 40-yard field goal for the only score of that quarter.  In the 4th quarter, they sealed the game when Ben Tate ran for a 1-yard TD making the score 31–3.  The Steelers drove down the field and Ben Roethlisberger found Lance Moore on a 26-yard TD pass for a final score of 31–10.

With the loss, the Steelers fell to 3–3 and last place in the AFC North.

Week 7: vs. Houston Texans

Following a terrible loss to the Browns, the Steelers returned home for a duel against the Texans on Monday Night Football.  The Texans started out strong when Ryan Fitzpatrick found Alfred Blue on an 11-yard pass for a 7–0 lead and the only score of the first quarter.  In the 2nd quarter, the Texans increased their lead as Randy Bullock nailed 2 field goals from 39 and 38 yards out for 10–0 and 13–0 leads.  The Steelers finally got on the board and scored 24 unanswered points:  first starting with Shaun Suisham who nailed a 44-yard field goal for a 13–3 game followed up by Ben Roethlisberger finding Martavis Bryant on a 35-yard TD pass for a 13–10 game and eventually took the lead on Antonio Brown's 1-yard TD pass to Lance Moore 17–13 and lastly Roethlisberger hooking up with Le'Veon Bell on a 2-yard TD pass for a 24–13 halftime lead.  After a scoreless 3rd quarter, the Texans came within 8 as Bullock kicked a 31-yard field goal for a 24–16 game not long before the Steelers responded with 2 of their own from Suisham when he got them from 30 and 40 yards out for leads of 27–16 and 30–16.  Finally, Fitzpatrick was able to find Arian Foster on a 1-yard TD pass and this led to the final score of 30–23.

With the win, the Steelers improved to 4–3.

Week 8: vs. Indianapolis Colts

After a tough win over the Texans, the Steelers stayed home for a game against the Colts.  In the first quarter, the Colts scored first as Adam Vinatieri nailed a 31-yard field goal for a 3–0 lead.  However, the Steelers took the lead later on in the quarter when Ben Roethlisberger found Markus Wheaton on an 18-yard TD pass for a 7–3 game.  In the 2nd quarter, the Steelers would score again increasing their lead as Roethlisberger found Martavis Bryant on a 5-yard TD pass for a 14–3 game.  This was followed by William Gay picking off Andrew Luck and returning it 33 yards for a TD as they increased their lead to 21–3.  The Colts however responded as Andrew Luck threw a 21-yard TD pass to Dwayne Allen for a 21–10 game.  However, the Steelers pulled away as Roethlisberger would find Antonio Brown on 2 consecutive TD passes:  from 8 and 47 yards out to increase their lead at first from 28–10 to 35–10.  The Colts responded with 10 straight points first being Luck who found T. Y. Hilton on a 28-yard TD Pass for a 35–17 game followed by Vinatieri kicking a 23-yard field goal before halftime to make the score 35–20.  The Steelers went back to work in the 3rd quarter as Roethlisberger and Bryant hooked up again on a 2-yard TD pass to increase their lead making the score 42–20.  The Colts however were able to come within 8 later on when Ahmad Bradshaw ran for a 12-yard TD followed by Luck finding Donte Moncrief on a 31-yard TD pass to make the score 42–27 and then 42–34.  In the 4th quarter, it was all Steelers when a penalty was enforced on Luck in the end zone for a safety making the score 44–34.  The Steelers were able to seal the game later on when Roethlisberger found Heath Miller on an 11-yard TD pass for a final score of 51–34.

With the win, the Steelers improved to 5–3.

Roethlisberger set franchise records with 522 yards passing and six touchdowns while picking up his 100th victory in his 150th start. Roethlisberger's yardage total was the fourth highest in NFL history. He became the first player in NFL history to go over 500 yards passing twice as the Steelers won consecutive games for the first time this season.

Week 9: vs. Baltimore Ravens

The Steelers stayed home for a 3-game home stand and for a Sunday Night duel against the Ravens.  The Ravens scored first when Joe Flacco hooked up with Torrey Smith 35-yard TD pass to take a 7–0 lead for the only score of the first quarter.  In the 2nd quarter, the Steelers managed to tie the game up when Ben Roethlisberger found Le'Veon Bell on a 5-yard TD pass for a 7–7 game.  They eventually took the lead when Roethlisberger found Martavis Bryant on a 19-yard TD pass to make it a 14–7 game.  The Ravens came within 4 as Justin Tucker kicked a 46-yard field goal to make it 14–10 game.  However, the Steelers would manage to go ahead by 12 before halftime when Roethlisberger found Markus Wheaton on a 47-yard TD pass followed by a successful 2-point conversion for a 22–10 lead at halftime.  After a scoreless 3rd quarter, the Steelers came out strong and went back to work in the 4th when Roethlisberger found Antonio Brown on a 54-yard TD pass making the score 29–10.  The Ravens responded with a big play as Jacoby Jones ran a 108-yard kickoff return for a TD to make it a 29–17 game. Roethlisberger found Bryant again on an 18-yard TD pass to make the score 36–17.  This was followed by the Ravens trying their hand at coming back when Flacco found Crockett Gillmore on a 1-yard TD pass (with a failed 2-point conversion) for a 36–23 score.  But the Steelers were able to seal the game when Roethlisberger found Matt Spaeth on a 33-yard TD pass for a final score of 43–23, to give each team 49 points in their two meetings. The Ravens would Peter Jackson the series in the playoffs.

With the win, the Steelers improved to 6–3.

A week after passing for a franchise-record six touchdowns against Indianapolis, Roethlisberger duplicated the feat to lead Pittsburgh to its third consecutive win. The 12 touchdown passes over the last two games broke the NFL record of 11 set by Tom Flores for Oakland in the AFL in 1963 and matched by New England's Tom Brady in 2007.

Week 10: at New York Jets

The Steelers then traveled further east to take on the Michael Vick-led Jets.  The Jets scored in the first quarter when Nick Folk scored a 23-yard field goal for a 3–0 lead.  This was followed by 2 touchdowns by the Jets as Michael Vick found T.J. Graham and Jace Amaro on 67-yard and 5-yard TDs for scores of 10–0 and 17–0.  The Steelers got on the board before halftime as Shaun Suisham nailed a 53-yard field goal for a 17–3 halftime score.  In the 3rd quarter, the Jets went back to work as Folk scored a 30-yard field goal for a 20–3 game.  The Steelers would then score 10 points in the 4th quarter:  Suisham's 27-yard field goal to get within 2 TDs followed by Ben Roethlisberger hooking up with Martavis Bryant on an 80-yard TD pass to come within a TD.  The Jets got the ball back and Vick took knees to end the game with a final score of 20–13.
With the loss, the Steelers dropped to 6–4.

The Jets had forced 4 takeaways against the Steelers.  Ben who had thrown 12 touchdowns and no picks in the 2 games before this one had thrown only 1 touchdown pass and threw 2 interceptions.  On a positive note, Roethlisberger had thrown 13 touchdown passes and 2 interceptions in the last 3 games alone.

Week 11: at Tennessee Titans

After a tough loss to the Jets, the Steelers traveled
to LP Field to take on the Titans.  In the first quarter, the Steelers scored first when Shaun Suisham kicked a 49-yard field goal for a 3–0 lead.  They increased their lead as William Gay picked off Zach Mettenberger and returned it 28 yards for a TD for a 10–0 lead.  The Titans finally got on the board when Bishop Sankey ran for a 9-yard TD for a 10–7 game.  However, the Steelers pulled away as Suisham kicked another field goal from 23 yards out for a 13–7 lead.  In the 2nd quarter, it was all Titans when Ryan Succop kicked a 20-yard field goal to come within 3, 13–10.  They eventually took the lead when Mettenberger found Nate Washington on an 80-yard TD pass and led the game 17–13 at halftime.  After the break, the Titans went back to work in the 3rd quarter with Mettenberger finding Chase Coffman on a 4-yard TD pass for a 24–13.  In the 4th quarter, the Steelers staged a comeback when Le'Veon Bell ran for a 5-yard TD to come within 4, 24–20.  Then Roethlisberger found Antonio Brown on a 12-yard TD pass later on in the quarter to retake the lead 27–24.  The defense was able to hold off the Titans offense and recovered the onside kick with less than 2 minutes remaining, sending the Steelers to 7–4 going into their bye week.

Le'Veon Bell ran for 204 yards, an NFL high for a single game so far in 2014. It was also the best game by a Steelers running back since 2010. This was the Steelers' only game outside of the Eastern Time Zone time zone during the  season.

Week 13: vs. New Orleans Saints

Coming off of their bye week, the Steelers traveled back home to take on the Saints.  In the first quarter, the Steelers scored when Shaun Suisham nailed a 49-yard field goal for a 3–0 lead for the only score.  They increased their lead when Suisham kicked a 31-yard field goal for a 6–0 game.  The Saints took the lead as Drew Brees found Benjamein Watson on a 15-yard TD pass for a 7–6 game.  This was followed up by Brees finding Eric Long on a 4-yard pass for a 14–6 halftime lead.  After the break, the Saints got back to work as Brees found Nick Toon on an 11-yard TD pass to go ahead 21–6.  The Steelers were able to pull within 8 as Le'Veon Bell ran for a 1-yard TD for a 21–13 game.  The Saints pulled away as Brees found Kenny Stills on a 69-yard TD pass for a 28–13 game.  In the 4th quarter, the Steelers scored another field goal thanks to Suisham kicking it from 47 yards out for a 28–16 game.  However, the Saints pulled away as Brees hooked up with Marques Coltson on a 3-yard TD pass for a 35–16 game.  Ben Roethlisberger would throw his 2 touchdowns of the whole game both to Antonio Brown as time expired from 4 and 3 yards out with successful 2-point conversions tacked on with scores of 35–24 and a final score of 35–32.

With the loss, the Steelers dropped to 7–5.

Week 14: at Cincinnati Bengals

After a tough loss at home, the Steelers traveled to Cincinnati to take on the Bengals.  After a scoreless first quarter, the Steelers were the first to score in the 2nd when Ben Roethlisberger found Heath Miller on a 1-yard TD pass for a 7–0 lead.  Afterwards, the Bengals would tie it at 7–7 when Andy Dalton hooked up with Jermaine Gresham on a 10-yard TD pass.  They took the lead when Dalton ran for a 20-yard TD himself for a 14–7 game.  The Steelers wrapped up the scoring of the first half coming within 4 when Shaun Suisham kicked a 22-yard field goal for a 14–10 game at halftime.  The Steelers retook the lead in the 3rd quarter when Roethlisberger found Le'Veon Bell on a 10-yard TD pass for a 17–14 game.  However, the Bengals took the lead back when Dalton found A. J. Green on an 81-yard TD pass to make the score 21–17.  In the 4th quarter, it was all Steelers when they scored 25 consecutive points:  First coming within 1 as Suisham kicked a 44-yard field goal for a 21–20 game followed by 3 straight touchdowns:  Le'Veon Bell ran for a 13-yard TD with a successful 2-point conversion as they retook the lead 28–21, followed by Roethlisberger finding Martavis Bryant on a 94-yard TD pass to move ahead 35–21 and finally Bell ran for another TD from 22 yards out for the eventual final score of 42–21.

With the win, the Steelers improved to 8–5 with their odds of winning the AFC North and playoff hopes looking really bright.

Week 15: at Atlanta Falcons

After a huge win over the Bengals, the Steelers traveled down south to take on the Falcons.  In the first quarter, it was all Steelers as Shaun Suisham scored 2 38-yard field goals for 3–0 and 6–0 leads.  In the 2nd quarter, the Steelers would increase their lead when William Gay picked off Matt Ryan and returned the interception 51 yards for a TD for a 13–0 game.  The Falcons finally got on the board when Ryan found Devin Hester on a 17-yard TD pass to shorten the lead to 13–7.  Le'Veon Bell would wrap up the scoring before halftime with a 1-yard run for a 20–7 halftime lead.  In the 3rd quarter, it was all Falcons as Matt Bryant kicked 2 field goals:  from 28 and 22 yards out to shorten the lead to 20–10 then 20–13.  The Steelers however managed to pull away in the 4th quarter when Bell ran for a 13-yard TD for a 27–13 game.  The Falcons tried their hand at coming back when Ryan found Roddy White on a 4-yard TD pass for a 27–20 game.  With minutes left, the Steelers recovered the onside kick and moved down the field.  Ben Roethlisberger took knees to end the game with that final score.

With the win, the Steelers improved to 9–5 and endured their first winning season since 2011.

Ben Roethlisberger set a new Steelers franchise passing yardage record, surpassing his previous franchise record from 2009. He also became the sixth QB in NFL history to record a win against all other teams in the NFL. Le'Veon Bell also broke the Steelers franchise record of yards from scrimmage, breaking the mark held by Barry Foster. William Gay also set a new Steelers franchise record when he recorded his third interception return for a touchdown on the year.

Week 16: vs. Kansas City Chiefs

After a close win against the Falcons, the Steelers returned home for a game against the Chiefs.  They were facing a WIN AND IN scenario for the playoffs.  They would score first in the first quarter when Shaun Suisham kicked a 23-yard field goal for a 3–0 lead.  The Chiefs managed to tie it up later on in the quarter when Cairo Santos nailed a 35-yard field goal for a 3–3 game.  The Chiefs took the lead in the 2nd quarter when Santos kicked a 25-yard field goal for a 6–3 game.  The Steelers later on in the quarter retook the lead as Le'Veon Bell ran for a 1-yard TD for a halftime score of 10–6.  After the break, the Steelers got back to work in the 3rd quarter as Ben Roethlisberger found Antonio Brown on a 3-yard TD pass for a 17–6 game.  In the 4th quarter, the Chiefs came within 8 when Santos kicked another field goal from 43 yards out for a 17–9 game.  The Steelers however pulled away as Suisham kicked a 20-yard field goal for a 20–9 game.  Santos would later on kick a 23-yard field goal for the eventual final score of 20–12.

With the win, the Steelers improved to 10–5 and earned their first playoff berth since 2011.

Antonio Brown finished the game with 122 catches on the season, the third-highest single-season total in league history while Jamaal Charles was held to his second-lowest rushing total of the season.

Week 17: vs. Cincinnati Bengals

After clinching a playoff spot, the Steelers stayed for a Sunday Night Football duel against the Bengals with the AFC North division title on the line with them also riding a 3-game winning streak.

In the first quarter, the Steelers took an early lead when Antonio Brown ran a punt return 71 yards for a touchdown for a 7–0 game. The Bengals tied it up when Andy Dalton found Giovani Bernard on a 17-yard TD pass for a 7–7 game.  The Bengals took the lead in the 2nd quarter when Mike Nugent kicked a 39-yard field goal for a 10–7 game.  But the Steelers managed to tie the game up 10–10 when Shaun Suisham kicked a 29-yard field goal.  This was followed up by the Steelers retaking the lead as Ben Roethlisberger found Martavis Bryant on a 21-yard TD pass for a 17–10 lead followed by Suisham kicking another field goal from 25 yards out for a 20–10 halftime lead.  After a scoreless 3rd quarter, both teams traded touchdowns in the 4th:  Dalton found Jermaine Gresham on a 4-yard pass to shorten the lead to 20–17, but the Steelers pulled away as Roethlisberger found Brown on a 63-yard pass to seal the game with the final score being 27–17.

With the win the Steelers finished 11–5 and won their first division title since 2010.  Also they swept the Bengals for the first time since 2011.

Roethlisberger tied Drew Brees for top passer in 2014 with 4,952 yards, Le'Veon Bell finished 2nd in rushing yards with 1,361, and Antonio Brown finished 1st in receiving yards with 1,698 and tied for 2nd in receiving touchdowns with 13. The Steelers offense finished 2nd in total yards per game (411.1), tied for 1st in yards per play (6.2) and 7th in points per game (27.2). The defense finished 18th in total yards allowed per game (353.4), 27th in passing yards allowed per game (253.1), 6th in rushing yards allowed per game (100.3) and 18th in points per game (23.0)

Postseason

AFC Wild Card Playoffs: vs. #6 Baltimore Ravens

Ben Roethlisberger was sacked five times and threw two interceptions in the loss, eliminating the Steelers from the playoffs. Baltimore's 13-point victory was the fourth-biggest win by a road team in Steelers postseason history. The Steelers fell to 9–1 when facing a team for a third time in the same season since the 1970 merger, 9–2 overall in such situations. The Ravens advanced to the divisional round for the sixth time since 2008. It would also mark safety Troy Polamalu's final game in a Steelers' uniform, as he announced his retirement on April 9, 2015.

Standings

Division

Conference

Statistics
Updated December 30, 2014

Team

Passing

Rushing

Receiving

Field Goals

Punting

Punt Returns

Kick Returns

Defense

Interceptions

Transactions
The Steelers have been involved in the following transactions during the 2014 season:

Free agents

Waivers

Signings

Other

References

External links 
 2014 Pittsburgh Steelers season at Pro Football Reference 
 2014 Pittsburgh Steelers season statistics at jt-sw.com 

Pittsburgh
Pittsburgh Steelers seasons
2014 in sports in Pennsylvania
AFC North championship seasons
2010s in Pittsburgh